is a Japanese manga artist, creator of erotic comic series Slut Girl and the non-erotic manga called . He started his career in 1994 producing work that would later be published in dōjinshi by the  circle. His stories typically involve both erotic and humorous situations, focusing on characters' personality and sexual interaction during the story.

Isutoshi has produced a number of short works for hentai anthologies such as SNK Monogatari, Bruem - King of Fighters and Gensen Sexy Fighters, some of which were collected by Gerumaru in the Renge dōjinshi. Isutoshi has also produced short works published in the monthly hentai magazine Comic Kairakuten Beast.

Career
Isutoshi wrote and illustrated the Japanese erotic manga series , which humorously focuses on the sex-driven relationship between the chief characters. 'It was first published in 1999 by Fujimi Shuppan. It was translated and published as a six issue series in the U.S. by Eros Comix in 2000. In May 2003 Kodansha released Slut Girl +α, a reprint with an extra chapter. Derek Guder gave the manga series a three-star review in Manga: The Complete Guide, praised for "distinctive" and "expressive" drawings, and the fact that not only are the manga's women well made, but also the recurrent humor: "The story lines are played up for comedic payoff, and you can't help but laugh at the characters' facial expressions liven up otherwise boring sex scenes."  Timothy Perper and Martha Cornog praise the expressive translation of the English edition, and describe Sayoko as a "tsuya/yoen" woman, a complex figure with "voluptuous charm" and "bewitching beauty".  They describe the manga as being a satire on modern life, especially the role of women in the workplace, and a "long-enduring glass ceiling".

Other works
 Renge Returns (1996): dōjinshi collecting some of Isutoshi's previous works published by the Gerumaru circle.
 Renge Ver, EVA (1996): dōjinshi collecting some of Isutoshi's previous works published by the Gerumaru circle.
 Renge Ver. EVA 2 (1996): dōjinshi collecting some of Isutoshi's previous works published by the Gerumaru circle.
 Renge Ver. Sakura (1997): dōjinshi collecting some of Isutoshi's previous works published by the Gerumaru circle.
 Funky Animal (1997) Darkstalkers dōjinshi, collaborative work with several dōjinshi circles.
 High School Planet Prowler (1999-2000)
 Mysterious Thief Police (20??) A one-off published in Young Comic to celebrate its 15th anniversary.
 Slut Girl (1999): Slut Girl was translated and published as six issues comics in the U.S. by Eros Comix in 2000.
 Slut Girl +α (2003): A reprint of Slut Girl with an extra chapter concluding the story,
 Tende Freeze! (2002–2004): In 4 tankōbon volumes
 AIKI (2004-2013) Publish in Young King
 The Lord King from Ero-Isu Series (2006)
 Yarase (one-shot)
 AIKI S (2013-2018)Published in Young King Hours GH

References

External links
 

 Isutoshi  at Media Arts Database 

Year of birth missing (living people)
Manga artists
Hentai manga artists
Living people